Hoya aurigueana is an endemic species of porcelainflower or wax plant found in the Quezon province, Luzon, Philippines is an Asclepiad species of flowering plant in the dogbane family Apocynaceae described in 2012 by Kloppenburg, Siar & Cajano. Hoya aurigueana belongs to the genus Hoya. There are no subspecies listed.

Etymology
The specific epithet, aurigueana refers to the name of the Senior Science Research Specialist at the Philippine Nuclear Research Institute, Mr. Fernando B. Aurigue who collected the plant.

References

aurigueana
Endemic flora of the Philippines
aurigueana